Wansapanataym is a Philippine fantasy series produced and broadcast by ABS-CBN.

Series overview

Episode summary

2010 revival

Season 1

Season 2

Season 3

Season 4

Season 5

Season 6

Season 7

See also
List of WansapanaSummer episodes

References

Lists of anthology television series episodes
Lists of Philippine drama television series episodes